Andrej Bertoncelj is a Slovenian economist and politician. From September 2018, he served as Minister of Finance in the 13th Government of Slovenia. He resigned in January 2020.

References 

Living people
Year of birth missing (living people)
Place of birth missing (living people)
21st-century Slovenian politicians
Finance ministers of Slovenia
Deputy Prime Ministers of Slovenia
21st-century Slovenian economists